Hajj Salim Mahalleh (also Romanized as Ḩājj Salīm Maḩalleh; also known as Ḩājjī Salīm Maḩalleh) is a village in Rudboneh Rural District, Rudboneh District, Lahijan County, Gilan Province, Iran. At the 2006 census, its population was 918, in 281 families.

References 

Populated places in Lahijan County